CHAH is a Canadian radio station, broadcasting at 580 AM in Edmonton, Alberta. The station airs a multilingual programming format branded as My Radio 580 and is owned by 1811258 Alberta Ltd.

History
On January 6, 2017, the Canadian Radio-television and Telecommunications Commission (CRTC) approved an application by 1811258 Alberta Ltd. for a broadcasting licence to operate an ethnic commercial AM radio station in Edmonton. The new station would operate on the frequency of 580 kHz with a power of 10,000 watts fulltime.

AM 580 was a frequency in Edmonton that was once occupied by CKUA from 1927 until it went off the air in 2013.

On September 28, 2020, after on-air testing  began in the summer, the station officially signed on the air as My Radio 580.

References

External links
 My Radio 580
History of CHAH - Canadian Communications Foundation
 

HAH
HAH
Radio stations established in 2020
2020 establishments in Alberta